The Gay Hussar was a celebrated Hungarian restaurant located at 2 Greek Street, Soho, central London, England. It was established in 1953 and closed in 2018.

History 
Victor Sassie was the founder of The Gay Hussar restaurant in 1953. Sassie was sent to Budapest in Hungary by the British Hotel and Restaurant Association when he was 17. He served his apprenticeship at the Gundel restaurant in Budapest. On his return to London in 1940, he established first the Budapest restaurant and then The Gay Hussar, which was to become popular with left-wing politicians. Diners included T. S. Eliot, Mortimer Wheeler, Aneurin Bevan, Barbara Castle, Ian Mikardo and Michael Foot.

The restaurant is named in honour of the elite Hussars of the Hungarian army. The name is also associated with the name of a popular Hungarian operetta, The Gay Hussars, by Emmerich Kálmán.

In October 2013, it was made known that owners Corus Hotels would put the Gay Hussar up for sale. A group of journalists, politicians and lawyers formed the "Goulash Co-operative Ltd" to raise money to secure the eight-year lease, but its bid was rejected by Corus. The restaurant closed in June 2018.

In 2020, a restaurant called "Noble Rot Soho" opened on the site.

References

External links 

The Gay Hussar website

1953 establishments in England
2018 disestablishments in England
Buildings and structures in the City of Westminster
Defunct European restaurants
Defunct restaurants in London
European restaurants in London
Greek Street
Hungarian restaurants
Restaurants disestablished in 2018
Restaurants established in 1953
Soho, London